Bipolaris incurvata is a plant pathogen that causes blight and leaf spots in coconut trees.

References

External links
 Index Fungorum
 USDA ARS Fungal Database

Fungal plant pathogens and diseases
Coconut palm diseases
Pleosporaceae